Balaghat Lok Sabha constituency is one of the 29 Lok Sabha constituencies in Madhya Pradesh state in central India. This constituency covers the entire Balaghat district and part of Seoni district.

Assembly segments
Like most other Lok Sabha seats in MP and Chhattisgarh, with few seats like Durg (which has nine assembly segments under it) being exceptions, Balaghat Lok Sabha seat has 8 assembly seats as its segments. Presently, since the delimitation of the parliamentary and legislative assembly constituencies in 2008, Balaghat Lok Sabha constituency comprises the following eight Vidhan Sabha (Legislative Assembly) segments:

Members of Parliament

Election Results

General Elections 2019

General Elections 2014

See also
 Balaghat district
 List of Constituencies of the Lok Sabha

References

Lok Sabha constituencies in Madhya Pradesh
Balaghat district